Juan Rodrigo Rojas Avelar (born 9 April 1988 in Fernando de la Mora) is a Paraguayan professional footballer who plays as a midfielder for Club Olimpia.

On 19 July 2015, Paraguayan newspaper ExtraPRESS named Rojas one of the most expensive player in Paraguay.

Career

Olimpia Asunción
Rojas started his career in the youth divisions of Olimpia and made his way to the first team in 2007. He became a regular starter for the team in 2009 scoring many goals and having great performances as a midfielder. Due to his good performances for Olimpia he was called up to the national team by Gerardo Martino. On 11 January 2010, River Plate signed the Paraguayan attacking midfielder on loan from Olimpia. He is a great midfielder with a strong personality and so he was recommended by Martino and Gregorio Perez.

River Plate
He made his River debut against the all time rival, Boca Juniors. While it was only a friendly pre-season match, Boca played with their usual starters. River, however, gave playing time to mostly youth talent along with veteran captain Matias Almeyda. Rojas' first half strike from just outside the box opened up what would be a 3–1 win over its archrivals.

O'Higgins
After a brief loan spell with Belgian club Beerschot, Rojas signed for mid-level Chilean team O'Higgins, slowly becoming an integral part of the team, being used both as a starter and off the bench in a variety of positions to contribute to the team's play-making and score several key goals. As of 23 April 2012, Rojas had 4 goals in 10 matches played (5 of them as a substitute).

See also
 Players and Records in Paraguayan Football

References

External links
 
 
 
 
 Un regalo para el Jefe 
 Rodrigo Rojas sorteó con éxito la revisación médica 

1988 births
Living people
People from Fernando de la Mora, Paraguay
Paraguayan footballers
Paraguayan expatriate footballers
Paraguay international footballers
Cerro Porteño players
Club Olimpia footballers
Club Atlético River Plate footballers
Beerschot A.C. players
O'Higgins F.C. footballers
Universidad de Chile footballers
C.F. Monterrey players
Club Sol de América footballers
Paraguayan Primera División players
Chilean Primera División players
Argentine Primera División players
Belgian Pro League players
Expatriate footballers in Chile
Expatriate footballers in Argentina
Expatriate footballers in Belgium
Expatriate footballers in Mexico
Association football wingers
Copa América Centenario players
2019 Copa América players